Transmission Zero is an album released in November 2011 by Ghoul. It is the first album under their new label, Tankcrimes records.

Track listing

Personnel
Ghoul
Digestor - vocals, guitars
Dissector - vocals, guitars
Cremator - vocals, bass
Fermentor - drums, vocals

References

2011 albums
Concept albums
Ghoul (band) albums